Egger is a German surname. Notable people with the surname include:

Albin Egger-Lienz (1868–1926), Austrian painter
Émile Egger (1813–1885), French philologist
Hubert Egger (1927–2014), West German cross country skier
Johann Egger (1804–1866), Austrian entomologist
Jolanda Egger (born 1960), Swiss model and actress
Joseph Egger (1889–1966), Austrian actor
Juerg Egger (born 1982), Swiss bobsledder
Markus Egger (born 1975), Swiss beach volleyball player
Markus Egger (footballer) (born 1990), Austrian footballer
Regula Egger (born 1958), Swiss Olympic javelin thrower
Reinhard Egger (Luftwaffe) (1905–1987), German paratrooper
Reinhard Egger (born 1989), Austrian luger
René Egger (1916–2016), French architect
Roscoe L. Egger Jr. (1920–1999), American IRS commissioner
Stephanie Egger (born 1988), Swiss mixed martial artist
Urs Egger (1953–2020), Swiss actor and director
Wolfgang Egger (born 1963), German car designer
Waltraud Egger (born 1950), Italian athlete

See also 
Egger (disambiguation)
Eggers (surname)
Eggar (disambiguation)
Ecker

Swiss-German surnames
Surnames of South Tyrolean origin
Surnames of Austrian origin
German toponymic surnames